Blue in Green: The Concert in Canada is a live album by jazz pianist Bill Evans with Eddie Gómez and Marty Morell recorded in Camp Fortune, Gatineau, Quebec, Canada in 1974 and released on the Milestone label in 1991.

Reception
The Allmusic review by Scott Yanow awarded the album 4½ stars and states: "The tight and almost telepathic musical communication between the musicians, the strong repertoire and the appreciative audience make this a fairly definitive recording by this classic unit".

Track listing
All compositions by Bill Evans except as indicated
 "One for Helen" - 6:13
 "The Two Lonely People" (Bill Evans, Carol Hall) - 7:03
 "What Are You Doing the Rest of Your Life?" (Alan and Marilyn Bergman, Michel Legrand) - 4:38
 "So What" (Miles Davis) - 6:47
 "Very Early" - 5:32
 "If You Could See Me Now" (Tadd Dameron, Carl Sigman) - 3:53
 "34 Skidoo" - 7:33
 "Blue in Green" (Davis, Evans) - 3:40
 "T.T.T. (Twelve Tone Tune)" - 5:29
Recorded in Camp Fortune, Ottawa, Ontario, Canada, in August, 1974.

Personnel
Bill Evans - piano
Eddie Gómez - bass
Marty Morell - drums

References

Bill Evans live albums
1991 live albums
Milestone Records live albums